Association Sportif Inter Star, is a football (soccer) club from Bujumbura, Burundi.

Squad

Management and staff

Honours
Burundi Premier League: 4
1991, 1992, 2005, 2008

Burundian Cup: 1
1990

Burundi Super Cup: 1
2011

Performance in CAF competitions
CAF Champions League: 2 appearances
2006 – First Round
2009 – Preliminary Round

CAF Confederation Cup: 2 appearances
2008 – Preliminary Round
2011 – Preliminary Round

References 

Football clubs in Burundi
1977 establishments in Burundi